Mokreni is a village in the municipality of Čaška, North Macedonia.

Demographics
On the 1927 ethnic map of Leonhard Schulze-Jena, the village is shown as a Serbianized Bulgarian Christian village. According to the 2021 census, the village had a total of 5 inhabitants. Ethnic groups in the village include:

Macedonians 5

References

Villages in Čaška Municipality